Evora hemidesma is a species of moth in the family Tortricidae. It is the only species in the monotypic genus Evora.

References

External links
tortricidae.com

Tortricidae genera
Olethreutinae